Argyrochosma pallens is a fern endemic to Mexico. It has narrow, divided leaves with brown axes; the leaves are dusted with white powder above and coated in it below. First described as a species in 1956, it was transferred to the new genus Argyrochosma (the "false cloak ferns") in 1987, recognizing their distinctness from the "cloak ferns" (Notholaena sensu stricto).

Description
Argyrochosma pallens is a medium-sized epipetric fern. The rhizome may be upright or decumbent (horizontal, curving upward at the tip). From it, the fronds arise in clumps. Of this length, from 20% to 33% is made up by the stipe (the stalk of the leaf, below the blade). Both stipe and rachis (leaf axis) are round and chestnut-brown, bearing farina (powder) and a scattering of narrow linear or slightly lance-shaped scales  of the same color.

They are bipinnate-pinnatifid to tripinnate (cut into pinnae and pinnules that are either deeply lobed or cut into pinnulets). The leaf segments are oblong to broadly deltate-ovate, and are obtuse (blunt) at the tip. The brown color of the axes does pass somewhat into the leaf tissue, but not strikingly so. The upper side of the leaf is covered with a scattering of white farina, which thickly covers the under side.

The leaf edges are slightly curved under, but not otherwise modified into false indusia. The plants are diploid, with a chromosome number of 2n = 54.

It is similar to Argyrochosma incana and can be somewhat difficult to distinguish from that species. However, its leaf blades are widest above the base (rather than at the base), and its rachides and stipes are shiny chestnut-brown and decorated with farina and scales (rather than black and free of ornament). It may also be mistaken for A. palmeri, but that species has darker leaf axes, without scales, and less farina on the upper surface.

Taxonomy
Notholaena pallens was first described by Rolla M. Tryon Jr. in 1956. The name was originally invented by Charles Alfred Weatherby while working on a revision of Notholaena, but he died before completing it and it was left to Tryon to finish and publish. The description is based on material collected by Cyrus Pringle in Durango. It had theretofore been identified as N. palmeri; however, the type specimen of that species was observed to have a black, rather than a chestnut-brown, rachis, lacking glands and scales, differentiating it from the material that had been assigned that name and necessitating the description of a new species for the latter. The epithet pallens means "pale"; no explanation for it was given. While Tryon considered it impossible to reasonably subdivide Notholaena into sections based on the data available at the time, both Edwin Copeland and Weatherby himself had suggested in the 1940s that a group of ferns related to N. nivea might represent a distinct genus of its own. This was finally addressed in 1987 by Michael D. Windham, who was carrying out phylogenetic studies of these genera. He elevated Notholaena sect. Argyrochosma to become the genus Argyrochosma, and transferred this species to that genus as A. pallens. In the following year, it was transferred by John Mickel and Joseph Beitel into Cheilanthes as C. pallens, but this name had already been published in 1827, rendering it illegitimate. In 2018, Maarten J. M. Christenhusz transferred the species to Hemionitis as H. pallens, as part of a program to consolidate the cheilanthoid ferns into that genus.

It lies within a subclade of the genus that also contains A. delicatula, A. incana, A. peninsularis, A. palmeri, and A. pilifera. All members of the clade share pale farina principally composed of terpenoid compounds, unlike the dihydrostilbenoids found in the farina of other members of the genus.

Distribution and habitat
Argyrochosma pallens is endemic to Mexico, occurring from Chihuahua southeast through central Mexico as far as Oaxaca.

Notes and references

References

Works cited

External links
Isotype of the species at JSTOR Plant Science.

pallens
Plants described in 1956
Ferns of Mexico
Endemic flora of Mexico